Shrirampur (Rural) is a census town in Ahmednagar district in the Indian state of Maharashtra.

Demographics
 India census, Shrirampur(Rural) had a population of 7510. Males constitute 51% of the population and females 49%. Shrirampur(Rural) has an average literacy rate of 69%, higher than the national average of 59.5%: male literacy is 79%, and female literacy is 59%. In Shrirampur(Rural), 12% of the population is under 6 years of age.

References

Cities and towns in Ahmednagar district